The Angola national football team represents Angola in men's international football and is controlled by the Angolan Football Federation. Nicknames Palancas Negras (Black Antelopes), the team is a member of both FIFA and the Confederation of African Football (CAF).

Angola reached its highest FIFA ranking of 45th in July 2000. Their greatest accomplishment was qualifying for the 2006 World Cup, their first-ever World Cup to date.

History
Angola played their first game against Congo on 8 February 1976, losing 3–2. On 26 June 1977, Cuba became Angola's first non-African opponent when the two countries met in Angola, with Angola winning 1–0. Angola entered World Cup qualifying for the first time in the 1986 qualifying competition. Angola defeated Senegal on penalties in the first round before narrowly losing to Algeria 3–2 on aggregate in the second round.

Angola qualified for their first Africa Cup of Nations in 1996. They were drawn in Group A with South Africa, Egypt and Cameroon. They lost their first two games to Egypt and South Africa, but managed a 3–3 draw against Cameroon. They finished bottom of the group and did not reach the second round. Angola then qualified for their second successive African Cup of Nations in 1998, but again failed to reach the second round, drawing 0–0 with South Africa and 3–3 with Namibia, and losing 5–2 to Ivory Coast.

After missing the last 3 tournaments, they qualified for the 2006 African Nations Cup. They recorded their first African Cup of Nations win against Togo, winning 3–2, two goals coming from Flávio and the other coming from Maurito. They also drew 0–0 against Congo DR and lost 3–1 against Cameroon. Angola's best performance then came in the 2008 African Nations Cup. They were drawn in Group D with Tunisia, South Africa and Senegal. They drew 1–1 and 0–0 with South Africa and Tunisia, then defeated Senegal 3–1, two goals coming from Manucho. In the quarter-finals they were beaten by eventual winners Egypt 2–1, but Manucho scored again, finishing with four goals in total.

Angola also won the COSAFA Cup in 1999, 2001 and 2004.

2006 FIFA World Cup
Angola qualified for the 2006 World Cup after only losing one game in the qualifiers ahead of favourites Nigeria.

When picking the squad, Gonçalves sought advice from Chelsea manager José Mourinho, whose wife was born in Angola. Angola's Golden Generation saw players like Akwá, João Ricardo, Paulo Figueiredo, Flávio Amado and Jamba selected to go to the World Cup. Angola played six warm-up games against South Korea, Mauritius, Lesotho, Argentina, Turkey and USA.

Angola played their first World Cup finals game against the Portuguese side, who won the match 1–0, the only goal coming from Pauleta. There was a very friendly environment in and around the stadium during this match because of the links and friendship between the countries of Angola and Portugal. Angola drew 0–0 in their second game with Mexico, and still had a chance of qualifying for the second round had they beaten Iran in their final group game, but the match finished 1–1 after goals by Flávio and Sohrab Bakhtiarizadeh. Angola were eliminated from the tournament only losing one game.

2010 World Cup failure
After the 2006 World Cup, many of Angola's most experienced players such as Akwá and João Ricardo retired from the international game, but the expectation was still high for the team to qualify for the 2010 World Cup in South Africa. The team had a bye through the first round of qualification and in the second round they were drawn in Group 3 along with Benin, Uganda and Niger. Despite winning their first two matches, Angola failed to proceed to the third round, missing out by two points.

2010 Africa Cup of Nations
As hosts of the 2010 Africa Cup of Nations, Angola were seeded in Group A along with Mali, Algeria, and Malawi. Coached by Manuel José, in their first game they drew 4–4 with Mali, after letting a 4–0 lead slip in the last 11 minutes (including three goals in stoppage time). They recovered from this by beating Malawi 2–0 in the second match, and topped the group by drawing 0–0 with Algeria. They were knocked out in the quarter final after a 1–0 defeat by eventual finalists Ghana.

Kit history

Kit manufacturer

Recent schedule and results

The following is a list of match results from the previous 12 months, as well as any future matches that have been scheduled.

2022

2023

Coaching history

  József Szabó (1965 – 1966)
  Zlatko Škorić (? – ?)
  Rubén García (? –1988)
  Carlos Queirós (1988–?)
  Jesualdo Ferreira (1989)
  Dušan Kondić (? –1993)
  Branco Arlindo (1993–?)
  Carlos Alhinho (1994–1995)
  Professor Neca (1996–1998)
  Carlos de Abreu (1998)
  Veselin Jelušić (1998)
  Djalma Cavalcante (1999)
  Carlos Alhinho (2000)
  Mário Calado (2000–2001)
  Ismael Kurtz (2002–2003)
  Luís Oliveira Gonçalves (2003–2008)
  Mabi de Almeida (2008–2009)
  Manuel José (2009–2010)
  Hervé Renard (2010)
  Zeca Amaral (2010)
  Lito Vidigal (2011–2012)
  Romeu Filemón (2012)
  Gustavo Ferrín (2012–2013)
  Romeu Filemón (2014–2015)
  José Kilamba (2016–2017)
  Beto Bianchi (2017–2018)
  Srđan Vasiljević (2018–2019)
  Pedro Gonçalves (2019–)

Players

Current squad
The following players have been selected for the 2023 Africa Cup of Nations qualification matches against Ghana on 23 and 27 March 2023.

Caps and goals as of 20 November 2022, after the match against South Africa.

Recent call-ups
The following players have also been called up to the Angola squad within the last 12 months and are still available for selection.

DEC Player refused to join the team after the call-up.
INJ Player withdrew from the squad due to an injury.
PRE Preliminary squad.
RET Player has retired from international football.
SUS Suspended from the national team.

Previous squads
FIFA World Cup
2006 FIFA World Cup squads – Angola

Africa Cup of Nations
2019 Africa Cup of Nations squads – Angola
2013 Africa Cup of Nations squads – Angola
2012 Africa Cup of Nations squads – Angola
2010 Africa Cup of Nations squads – Angola
2008 Africa Cup of Nations squads – Angola
2006 Africa Cup of Nations squads – Angola
1998 Africa Cup of Nations squads – Angola
1996 Africa Cup of Nations squads – Angola

Records

Players in bold are still active with Angola.

Most capped players

Top goalscorers

Competitive record

FIFA World Cup

As of 2022, Angola has qualified once for a FIFA World Cup. Its first participation in the World Cup qualifiers was in 1986, where they won in the first round, beating Senegal 4−3 on penalty kicks. They later lost in the second round of the 1986 World Cup qualifiers to Algeria. Algeria went to the third round and qualified for the 1986 World Cup in Mexico.

Angola's first participation in the World Cup was in the 2006 World Cup, in Germany.

Notes

Africa Cup of Nations

Notes

COSAFA Cup

Honours

COSAFA Cup
Winners (3): 1999, 2001, 2004
Central African Games
Runners-up (1): 1987
African Nations Championship
Runners-up (1): 2011

See also
 Angola women's national football team
 Angola national under-20 football team
 Angola national under-17 football team
 Angolan Football Federation

References

External links

Federação Angolana de Futebol
O'JOGO: News on Portugese speaking African football teams
Angola match records
Angola team picture during World Cup in 2006

 
African national association football teams
National sports teams established in 1976